Sky girls BW is a sisterhood that helps girls stay true to themselves and what they believe in. The organization airs on radio station RB2 and it is called Sky Live, with its new hosts being Karyn and Chipo.

Music 

In 2014 Zeus released a single TOUCH THE SKY and a music video for Sky Girls BW. The single was made in order to motivate, inspire and encourage teenage girls in situations like peer pressure.

Fashion 

Sky girls BW hosted a fashion show in 2014 at  Limkokwing Botswana showcasing their clothes made by the most famous and well known designers in Botswana. The fashion show was made to empower young girls being true to themselves and having them experience fashion at its best.

See also 
 Zeus
 Yarona FM

References 

Fashion organizations
Organisations based in Gaborone
2014 establishments in Botswana